Darwin: The Life of a Tormented Evolutionist is a biography of Charles Darwin by Adrian Desmond and James Moore. It is considered one of three scholarly biographies of Darwin, along with Charles Darwin: The Man and His Influence (1996) by Peter J. Bowler and Janet Browne's two-volume biography, Charles Darwin: Voyaging (1995) and Charles Darwin: The Power of Place (2002).

See also
Darwin Industry

References

1991 non-fiction books
Books about evolution
Books about Charles Darwin